Aq Kübek khan (?–~1550; also Aq Köbek), was a ruler of Astrakhan Khanate in 1532–1533 and 1545–1550. He was a son of Mortaza beg. He provided a policy against Crimean Khanate and Nogay Horde for Astrakhan Khanate's independence. Deposed by Yamghurchi khan. For uncertainties and additional information see the second part of List of Astrakhan khans.

1550 deaths
Khans of Astrakhan
Year of birth unknown